The Islander is a 1998 album by New Zealand singer-songwriter Dave Dobbyn. It reached #1 on the New Zealand music charts.

Background
The album's title comes from Dobbyn's reflection what it is to be a New Zealander: "I've come to terms with the fact that I'm a Pacific Islander a long time ago. There's nothing vaguely European about me apart from the colour of my skin. So I've called it The Islander because it's a stamp of identity."

Track listing

Critical reception
The album has been described as "quintessentially New Zealand" with Dobbyn at the peak of his talents. It is also noted as a culmination of the directness of his pub-rock DD Smash work and later rock albums, while 'Hallelujah Song' signals the start of his Christian influences in future releases.

Credits
 Bass – Alan Gregg (tracks: 1, 5, 8, 11), Bill McDonald (tracks: 2, 4, 6, 9, 12, 13)
 Drums – Peter Luscombe (tracks: 2 to 4, 6, 7, 9, 12, 13), Ross Burge (tracks: 1, 5, 8, 11)
 Guitar – Dave Dobbyn (tracks: 1 to 12), Neil Finn (tracks: 5, 6, 12)
 Harmonica – Dave Dobbyn (tracks: 5, 12, 13)
 Organ [Wurlitzer] – Dave Dobbyn (tracks: 4, 7, 8)
 Percussion – Michael Barker (2) (tracks: 1, 7, 8, 11), Peter Luscombe (tracks: 2 to 4, 6, 7, 9)
 Piano – Dave Dobbyn (tracks: 1, 5, 9, 12, 13)
 Producer, Vocals – Dave Dobbyn
 Recorded By, Mixed By – Sam Gibson

External links
 Discography: The Islander (davedobbyn.co.nz), track-by-track breakdown of songs
 Essential New Zealand Albums: The Islander, Radio New Zealand show
 Nick Bollanger review in The New Zealand Listener
  Review by Martin Bell, Real Groove Magazine, September 1998.

References

Dave Dobbyn albums
1998 albums